The Battle of Imjin River (Japanese: 臨津江の戦い) was a battle during the 1592 Japanese invasion of Korea. Gim Myeongweon's northern defense was defeated and the Japanese were able to cross over and invade northern Korea.

Background
The Joseon royal family left Hanseong for Pyeongyang on 9 June, a few days before the Japanese took the city on 12 June. When the Japanese arrived they found the city destroyed and in anarchy. After resting for two weeks in Hanseong, the Japanese armies resumed their advance on 27 June. The Japanese vanguard was the army under Konishi Yukinaga and Sō Yoshitoshi, followed by the army of Kato Kiyomasa and the army of Kuroda Nagamasa. The Japanese forces arrived at the Imjin River without difficulty, but found that the Koreans had finally managed to mount an effective defense, and had 10,000 soldiers amassed on the far bank under the command of Gim Myeongweon.

Battle
Although the Korean forces were in an ideal position, able to cut down the Japanese as they crossed the river in small numbers, the Korean army was hampered by the lack of a clear chain-of-command. Some of the defenders were not under Gim's command, including 3000 men from northern Korea under the government minister Han Ung-in. 

Seeing that the Koreans would not budge after waiting for ten days, the Japanese forces conducted a false retreat to lure them into attacking. The Koreans took the bait. One inexperienced commander, Sin Hal, immediately ordered his men to cross the river and attack the Japanese. A more experienced commander, Yu Geuk-ryang, was unable to dissuade him and ended up leading the charge himself after being accused of cowardice. Some of Han Un-in's veterans, experienced in Jurchen tactics, were also reluctant to follow, suspecting it to be a ruse, but they were executed. Gim Myeongweon thought the attack was a bad idea, but could do not stop it since he did not have full control over the entire army.

A portion of the Korean army thus crossed the river and rushed past the abandoned Japanese campsite into the ambush. The Japanese fired on them with muskets and chased them to the river, where they were slaughtered. Yu Geuk-ryang and Sin Hal were both killed. A civil official on the north bank of the river fled. Surrounding soldiers thought that he was Gim Myeongweon, so they panicked and fled as well, abandoning the defense.

Aftermath
The Japanese crossed the river by 7 July and took Kaesong without a fight. Afterwards the three divisions split up. Konishi Yukinaga went north to Pyeongyang, Kuroda Nagamasa went west to Hwanghae, and Katō Kiyomasa headed northeast to Hamgyeong.

On 10 June, King Seonjo began preparations to abandon Pyongyang for Yongbyon further north and by 16 July the vanguard of Konishi Yukinaga's forces had reached the south bank of the Taedong River within sight of the walls of Pyongyang.

In popular culture
This battle is celebrated in Activision's video game Shogun: Total War under "Imjin". The historical error in the game is that the Koreans have infantry forces only, while Japanese have balanced combined armed forces. Also the game shows the river having a bridge, which was not the case until the 20th century.

See also
List of battles during the Japanese invasions of Korea (1592–1598)
Timeline of the Japanese invasions of Korea

Citations

Bibliography

 
 
 
 
 
 
 
 
 
 
 桑田忠親 [Kuwata, Tadachika], ed., 舊參謀本部編纂, [Kyu Sanbo Honbu], 朝鮮の役 [Chousen no Eki]　(日本の戰史 [Nihon no Senshi] Vol. 5), 1965.

See also
 Battle of Chungju
 Battle of Sangju (1592)
 Imjin War

Imjin River, Battle of
1592 in Asia
1592 in Japan
Imjin River 1592